Lists of bishops of Greenland:

Before and during the Reformation:
 Garðar, Greenland#Diocese of Garðar

After the Reformation:
 Bishop of Greenland#List of Bishops of Greenland

Greenland